David Jarolím (born 17 May 1979 in Čáslav) is a Czech former footballer and manager of Ústí nad Labem.

A central midfielder by position, Jarolím was known for his stamina, passing and technical skill.

Club career
Born in Caslav, Czechoslovakia, Jarolím began his professional career with SK Slavia Praha before transferring to German club FC Bayern Munich while still a teenager.  Although he spent three seasons with the German giants, from 1997 to 2000, he played in only one competitive match with the first team squad.

Jarolím transferred to second division club 1. FC Nürnberg before the 2000–01 season, and played in nine matches during their promotion campaign.  During the 2001–02 season, Jarolím established himself as a key player in the Nürnberg squad, attracting the attention of other top clubs.

Following Nürnberg's relegation after the 2002–03 season, an agreement was reached for Jarolím's transfer to Hamburger SV at the close of the 2003–04 season.  However, just before the close of the transfer window in September 2003, the deal was brought forward, allowing Jarolím to play for Hamburg during that season. Jarolím has been an important member of Hamburg's first team squad ever since.  After Rafael van der Vaart joined Real Madrid, he took over as team captain.

International career
A former Czech U-21 international, Jarolím made his senior debut for the reformed Czech Republic national team on 8 October 2005. He was selected for the 2006 FIFA World Cup but did not see much playing time. During Euro 2008 qualifying he was regularly used as a substitute, making only one start, but did manage a goal in the 7–0 thrashing of San Marino. He played in all three matches at the tournament but the Czechs failed to progress past the group stage.

Personal life
Jarolím's father Karel, former coach of Czech Republic national football team, is also a former Slavia player and Czechoslovakia international. David's older brother Lukáš and cousin Marek Jarolím are also professional players.

Coaching and management career
After retiring at the end of the 2013–14 season, Jarolím was appointed sporting director of Mladá Boleslav. On 25 September 2019 it was confirmed, that Jarolím had been appointed manager of Olympia Radotín. He left the club at the end of the season. On 28 September 2019, he was then appointed manager of SK Rakovník. However, after only 9 days in charge, it was announced that his contract had been terminated by mutual agreement for personal reasons.

In January 2020, Jarolím was hired as U19 manager of FC Slavoj Vyšehrad.

In December 2020, Jarolím signed a contract with Ústí nad Labem until 2024.

Career statistics

International

International goals

|-
|| 1. || 7 October 2006 || U Nisy Stadion, Liberec, Czech Republic ||  || 5–0 || 7–0 || UEFA Euro 2008 qualification ||
|}

Honours
Bayern Munich
 UEFA Champions League finalist: 1998–99
 Bundesliga champion: 1998–99, 1999–2000
 Bundesliga runner-up: 1997–98
 DFB-Pokal winner: 1997–98, 1999–2000
 DFB-Pokal finalist: 1998–99
 DFB-Ligapokal winner: 1999

Hamburger SV
UEFA Intertoto Cup: 2005

References

External links

 
 
 

1979 births
Living people
Czech footballers
Czech football managers
Czech Republic youth international footballers
Czech Republic under-21 international footballers
Czech Republic international footballers
Czech expatriate footballers
SK Slavia Prague players
FC Bayern Munich footballers
FC Bayern Munich II players
1. FC Nürnberg players
Hamburger SV players
2006 FIFA World Cup players
Bundesliga players
2. Bundesliga players
Ligue 1 players
Expatriate footballers in Germany
Expatriate footballers in France
UEFA Euro 2008 players
Czech First League players
People from Čáslav
Thonon Evian Grand Genève F.C. players
FK Mladá Boleslav players
Association football midfielders
Czech expatriate sportspeople in Germany
Czech expatriate sportspeople in France
FK Ústí nad Labem managers
Sportspeople from the Central Bohemian Region
Czech National Football League managers